Mauzi may refer to

 Robert Mauzi (1927-2006), French professor of literary history
 Mauzi is the German name for the fictional Pokémon character, Meowth.